The Ministry of Education (MoE) is a government ministry in the United Arab Emirates that is responsible for regulating all forms of education in the country. Established by through the Federal Law No. (1) of 1972 issued by Sheikh Zayed, it has its main offices in Abu Dhabi, Dubai and Ajman.

COVID-19 Response 
After all schools had to be closed as of March 2020 to control the spread of COVID-19, the UAE Ministry of Education turned to distance learning for all academic levels.

The UAE Ministry of Education installed in March 2020 a FOR-A HVS-1200 video switcher at its headquarters in Ajman to drive a virtual studio system for distance learning programs, which has become essential due to the COVID-19 pandemic.

References

External links
 Ministry of Education
 Ministry of Education 

Education ministries
Government agencies of the United Arab Emirates